Rəcəbli or Radzhabli may refer to:
 Rəcəbli, Jalilabad, Azerbaijan
 Rəcəbli, Tartar, Azerbaijan